Yellowbelly may refer to:

 Yellowbelly (Lincolnshire), a person from the English county of Lincolnshire 
 Yellowbelly (Copthorne), a native-born resident of Copthorne, West Sussex, England
 A person from Wexford, Ireland, named so from the Wexford GAA county colours.
 Eastern yellowbelly racer (Coluber constrictor flaviventris), a subspecies of snake found in North America 
 Yellowbelly rockcod, the cod icefish Notothenia neglecta (often included in Notothenia coriiceps)
 Yellow-bellied slider, an aquatic turtle found in the south-eastern United States
 Golden perch, an Australian fish, also called callop 
 'Yellow belly' is also a term for 'coward'

Animal common name disambiguation pages